Planet Rock: The Album is an old school hip hop album by Afrika Bambaataa & Soulsonic Force, released in 1986 as a collection of previous singles.  The song "Planet Rock" was one of the earliest hits of the hip hop music genre and remains one of its pioneering recordings. The single's liner notes include members of Kraftwerk with the songwriting credits. In creating the track, portions of Kraftwerk's "Numbers" and "Trans-Europe Express" were interpolated (re-recorded in the studio, rather than through the use of a digital sampler), along with portions of songs by Captain Sky and Ennio Morricone.

Legacy
The song "Planet Rock" was ranked by Rolling Stone magazine at #240 on its list of the 500 Greatest Songs of All Time, and went on to become the first gold-certified vinyl 12-inch single. Slant Magazine listed the album at #84 on its list of "Best Albums of the 1980s".  The album was also included in the book 1001 Albums You Must Hear Before You Die.  "Renegades of Funk", the third track, was covered by Rage Against the Machine on its Renegades album.

Track listing

Personnel
Arthur Baker – producer, mixing
Keith LeBlanc – producer
Herb Powers Jr. – mastering
Latin Rascals – remixing
Afrika Bambaataa – producer, mixing
John Aquilino – illustrations, hand lettering
Jay Burnett – mixing
Albert Cabrera – remixing
Skip McDonald – producer
Tony Moran – remixing
John Robie – producer, mixing
LeRoi Evans – producer, mixing
Rae Serrano – producer
Adrian Sherwood – mixing
Andy Wallace – mixing
Doug Wimbish – producer
Monica Lynch – art direction
Steven Miglio – artwork, design
Fats Comet – producer, mixing
M.C. G.L.O.B.E. – additional vocals

References 

Afrika Bambaataa albums
1986 albums
Tommy Boy Records albums
Albums produced by Arthur Baker (musician)
Albums produced by Keith LeBlanc